The 139th running of the Kentucky Derby commenced at 6:33 pm Eastern Daylight Time (EDT) on May 4, 2013 at Churchill Downs. The race was televised in the United States on the NBC television network. The favorite, Orb, won a purse of $1.4 million with a final time of 2:02.89, with Golden Soul finishing second and Revolutionary placing third.

The attendance for the race was 151,616. Security was increased in the aftermath of the Boston Marathon bombings; coolers and large purses were banned.

Qualification

For the first time, the colts making the field in the Kentucky Derby qualified under a new points system. In years past, colts qualified based on graded stakes earnings. A total of thirty-six races, with the first coming last year, gave Derby starters an opportunity to accumulate points towards an entry into the race. Twenty horses qualified for the Kentucky Derby with two other horses (Fear the Kitten and Carving) listed as "also eligible" in case one of the starters would be scratched prior to the opening of betting.

Payout
The 139th Kentucky Derby Payout Schedule

 $2 Exacta: (16–4) $981.60
 $1 Trifecta: (16–4–3) $3,462.80
 $1 Superfecta: (16–4–3–5) $28,542.00

Field
After the draw of the field, Orb, the Florida Derby winner, was the 7-2 favorite. Trainer Todd Pletcher had five different horses in the race, including the winners of the Arkansas Derby (Overanalyze), Louisiana Derby (Revolutionary) and Wood Memorial (Verrazano). Among jockeys, noteworthy entrants were Kevin Krigger, who rode Goldencents, trying to become the first black jockey to win since Jimmy Winkfield in 1902, and Rosie Napravnik, riding Mylute, attempting to become the first female jockey to win the Derby.

Scratches
Black Onyx was scratched late after early betting began. As a result, it was too late for Fear the Kitten, who would have been eligible in the case of scratch, to enter the race. Connections for Carving, who was listed as "also eligible" after Fear the Kitten, elected not to make the trip to the Derby.

Race

On race day, rain fell steadily throughout the morning and early afternoon. The rain stopped before the start of the Derby, but the track conditions remained cold and "sloppy". All the pre-race favorites drew favorable posts.  Black Onyx drew lane one, which was left open when he scratched.

The Derby got off to a very fast start as Palace Malice took the early lead. As Normandy Invasion seized the lead, Orb was just about in last place. "I was so far behind. I just let him be calm and relaxed, and he was able to do it," said Orb jockey Joel Rosario.  "He was very relaxed and did exactly what I wanted. It was a perfect trip."

Orb rallied down the stretch, winning by 2 1/2 lengths in a time of 2:02.89. The win gave Hall of Fame trainer and native Kentuckian Shug McGaughey his first career Kentucky Derby victory. His horses were 0-6 in six previous Derby starts.  "I've always dreamed of this day and it finally came," McGaughey remarked. "I'm thrilled for the people who put in so much time on this horse, and of course I'm thrilled for me."  The win supplemented a record setting season for Rosario. He racked up 38 victories in the spring session, the most ever, and in March won the world's richest horse race - the $10 million Dubai World Cup.  The Derby marked Orb's fifth consecutive win, earning $1,414,800 and bringing the horse's lifetime winnings to $2,335,850.  He is owned by Ogden Mills Phipps and Stuart Janney III.

Golden Soul took second place while Revolutionary finished third. Revolutionary trainer, Todd Pletcher, who had a record tying five horses in the field, remarked "I thought he ran super. He got shuffled back farther than we thought and he had to keep waiting to try to make up ground ... He closed strongly and just ran out of ground." Normandy Invasion and Mylute rounded out the top five. Riding Mylute, Rosie Napravnik's fifth-place finish was the highest ever by a female jockey, besting her own record of ninth place set in 2011.

Results

Margins –  lengths, 1 length
Time – 2:02:89
Track – Sloppy (sealed)
Fear the Kitten was eligible but did not race.

Wagering
According to live odds on the Kentucky Derby website, more than $4.7 million was wagered on Orb of the $36.6 million gambled on the race, making the horse a 5-1 favorite as betting closed.

Just minutes before, Orb pulled even with Revolutionary as a 6-1 favorite even though more than $4 million was bet on Revolutionary and approximately $3.5 million on Orb.

Subsequent Grade I wins

Although Orb never won another race, several members of the Derby field went on to subsequent Grade I victories.
 Oxbow – 2013 Preakness Stakes
 Lines of Battle – 2015 Champions & Chater Cup
 Will Take Charge – 2013 Travers Stakes, Clark Handicap
 Palace Malice – 2013 Belmont Stakes, 2014 Metropolitan Handicap
 Verrazano – Haskell Invitational
 Itsmyluckyday – 2014 Woodward Stakes
 Goldencents – 2013 & 2014 Breeders' Cup Dirt Mile

References

Kentucky Derby races
Kentucky Derby
Derby
May 2013 sports events in the United States